Enghaveparken is a public park in the Vesterbro district of Copenhagen, Denmark. It was laid out in the late 1920s to cater for the citizens of the expanding city. The park is completely  closed off while undergoing comprehensive renovations June 2018-December 2019.

The park is designed in the Neoclassical style.  It has grassy lawns, flower beds and contains a bandstand, a playground and facilities for sports as well as barbecuing.

History

In the late 19th century, the Royal Danish Horticultural Society established 478 allotments in "Dronningens Enghave" at the site where Enghaveparken lies today. In the 1920s the allotments were moved and the small public park Enghaven was laid out under the direction of City Architect Poul Holsøe, who also designed the red-brick social housing which was built at the same time and borders the park on three sides. Tredje Natur has won a competition to redesign the park.

Layout and features
The slightly rectangular park is divided into six spaces: a water garden, a rose garden, a perennial garden, a sports section, a playground and a 'meeting place'.

Basin and fountain
Along its central axis, in front of the main entrance which faces Enghavevej, there is a gravel area centred on a square basin with a fountain. It is popular with ducks and grey heron which come from a colony on a small island in close by Frederiksberg Park.

Bandstand

At the extreme far end of the central axis, opposite the main entrance, stands a bandstand. It was designed by later famous Danish Modernist architect and designer Arne Jacobsen who spend his two first years after leaving architecture school working at Poul Holsøe's office. It is one of his only Neoclassical works. A year later he opened his own practice and built his first Modernist building. The bandstand is decorated with figure reliefs by Aage Nielsen-Edwin, depicting  Apollo and the Nine Muses.

Sculptures
In front of the main entrance stands the statue Venus med Æblet (Venus with the apple) by Kai Nielsen. The tight budget only allowed for this single piece of art at the time of the inauguration. Nielsen was popular with the Danish Neoclassical movement of the time, his work for instance dominates Carl Petersen's Faaborg Museum, the first major building of the movement. In 1933, Einar Utzon-Frank's statue Ungdom (Youth) was added.

Activities
The park is popular with locals for sunbathing or picnicking. It also has facilities for skater hockey, basketball, football and pétanque. The bandstand is frequently used for open-air concerts.

See also
 Parks and open spaces in Copenhagen

References

External links

 Enghaveparken on Google maps
 Enghavevej
 Venus med æblet

Vesterbro, Copenhagen
Parks in Copenhagen